Victoria Rodina (born October 29, 1989, Prokhladny, Kabardino-Balkarian Republic) is a Russian political figure and a deputy of the 8th State Duma. 

From 2012 to 2021, Rodina worked as coach at the specialized in athletics children's and youth sports school of the Olympic reserve. In 2016, she founded the charitable foundation "The World Where Good Is". The Foundation aims at assisting children with disabilities, orphans, children from large and low-income families, as well as children that find themselves in difficult situations. In 2016-2021, Rodina was the deputy of the Council of Local Self-Government of Prokhladny Urban District of the Kabardino-Balkarian Republic of the 6th convocation. Since September 2021, she has served as a deputy of the 8th State Duma.

On 24 March 2022, the United States Treasury sanctioned her in response to the 2022 Russian invasion of Ukraine.

References

1989 births
Living people
United Russia politicians
21st-century Russian politicians
Eighth convocation members of the State Duma (Russian Federation)
People from Prokhladny, Kabardino-Balkar Republic
Russian individuals subject to the U.S. Department of the Treasury sanctions